Roussoëlla is a genus of fungi in the family Roussoellaceae. The genus is characterized by two-celled ascospores, unitunicate asci with a small spherical apical ring that stains slightly blue with Melzer's reagent, and stromata with several perithecia. The genus was circumscribed by Italian mycologist Pier Andrea Saccardo in 1888, with Roussoella nitidula assigned as the type species. The generic name honours Marietta Hannon Rousseau, (1850–1926), who was a Belgian mycologist and taxonomist. 

Roussoellaceae was introduced by Liu et al. (2014) and contains three genera; Neoroussoella, Roussoella and Roussoellopsis.

Species
Roussoella aequatoriensis 
Roussoella alveolata 
Roussoella angusta 
Roussoella angustispora 
Roussoella aquatica 
Roussoella arundinacea 
Roussoella bambusae 
Roussoella calamicola 
Roussoella chiangraina 
Roussoella chilensis 
Roussoella doimaesalongensis 
Roussoella donacicola 
Roussoella guttulata 
Roussoella hysterioides 
Roussoella intermedia 
Roussoella japanensis 
Roussoella kunmingensis 
Roussoella magnata 
Roussoella mexicana 
Roussoella minutella 
Roussoella neopustulans 
Roussoella nitidula 
Roussoella palmicola 
Roussoella phyllostachydis 
Roussoella pseudohysterioides 
Roussoella pustulans 
Roussoella saltuensis 
Roussoella scabrispora 
Roussoella serrulata 
Roussoella siamensis 
Roussoella thailandica 
Roussoella tuberculata 
Roussoella verrucispora 
Roussoella verruculosa 
Roussoella yunnanensis

References

Pleosporales
Dothideomycetes genera
Taxa named by Pier Andrea Saccardo
Taxa described in 1888